Gary William Wight,  (born 21 September 1968) is an officer in the Royal Australian Navy (RAN). He joined the RAN as a submariner in 1987 and rose through the ranks to become the 8th Warrant Officer of the Navy in 2016. He relinquished the post in 2019 and was subsequently commissioned as an officer.

Early life
Wight was born in Liverpool, New South Wales, on 21 September 1968. He joined the Royal Australian Navy (RAN) in January 1987, later completing submarine training.

Naval career
He was promoted to warrant officer in 2006 and appointed Ships Warrant Officer of the frigate . In September 2012 he served as Command Warrant Officer of Career Management until he deployed on Operation Okra in June 2015 as the Command Warrant Officer of Joint Task Force 633.

Wight's operational service includes Special Operations Submarines, Operation Manitou and short deployments on Operation Okra and Operation Highroad. He became the 8th Warrant Officer of the Navy in 2016. He relinquished the post to Warrant Officer Deb Butterworth in November 2019, and was subsequently commissioned as an officer.

Wight was appointed a Member of the Order of Australia in the 2019 Queen's Birthday Honours in recognition of his "exceptional service to the Royal Australian Navy in the field of Navy People leadership and management." He holds a Master of Business Management from the University of New South Wales, is married, has four children and resides in Canberra.

References

1968 births
Living people
Members of the Order of Australia
Royal Australian Navy personnel
Submariners
University of New South Wales alumni